The Bocephus Box is a box set of songs recorded by country music artist Hank Williams, Jr. Produced by Jimmy Guterman, it was originally released in 1992 by Capricorn Records, and re-released in 2000 by Curb Records, with a slightly different track list. The updated version replaces Guterman's liner notes with a set written by Williams.

Track listing (2000 reissue)

Disc One
"A Country Boy Can Survive (Y2K Version)" (Williams, Jr.) (3:58) - featuring Chad Brock and George Jones
"Family Tradition" (Williams, Jr.) (4:00)
"To Love Somebody" (Barry Gibb, Robin Gibb) (3:09)
"Old Flame, New Fire" (Oskar Solomon) (2:38)
"Only Daddy That'll Walk the Line" (Jimmy Bryant) (3:18)
"I've Got Rights" (Williams, Jr.) (3:36)
"I Just Ain't Been Able" (Williams, Jr.) (2:37)
"Whiskey Bent and Hell Bound" (Williams, Jr.) (3:11)
"Outlaw Women" (Williams, Jr.) (3:02)
"(I Don't Have) Anymore Love Songs" (Williams, Jr.) (2:25)
"O.D.'d in Denver" (Williams, Jr.) (2:41)
"Come and Go Blues" (Gregg Allman) (4:05)
"The Conversation" (Ritchie Albright, Waylon Jennings, Williams, Jr.) (3:54) - duet with Waylon Jennings
"Old Habits" (Williams, Jr.) (3:05)
"Kaw-Liga" (Fred Rose, Hank Williams) (4:24)
"If You Don't Like Hank Williams" (Kris Kristofferson) (2:53)
"Dixie on My Mind" (Williams, Jr.) (2:37)
"Texas Women" (Williams, Jr.) (2:29)
"Ramblin' Man" (Williams) (3:37)
"Waitin' on the Tables to Turn" (Wayne Kemp, Mack Vickery) (2:40)
"A Country Boy Can Survive" (Williams, Jr.) (4:17)
"Born to Boogie" (Williams, Jr.) (2:45)
"Honky Tonk Women" (Jagger/Richards) (3:37)

Disc Two
"All My Rowdy Friends (Have Settled Down)" (Williams, Jr.) (4:01)
"I've Been Down" (Bunky Keel, Tony Stampley, Williams, Jr.) (3:42)
"La Grange" (Billy Gibbons, Dusty Hill, Frank Beard) (5:22)
"Leave Them Boys Alone" (Dean Dillon, Gary Stewart, Tanya Tucker, Williams, Jr.) (3:35)
"Blue Jean Blues" (Gibbons, Hill, Beard) (4:06)
"Midnight Rider" (Robert Payne, Allman) (2:49)
"Now I Know How George Feels" (Williams, Jr.) (2:48)
"All My Rowdy Friends Are Coming Over Tonight" (Williams, Jr.) (2:58)
"Major Moves" (Williams, Jr.) (3:34)
"Ain't Misbehavin'" (Fats Waller, Harry Brooks, Andy Razaf) (4:35)
"Lawyers, Guns and Money (Warren Zevon) (3:13)
"This Ain't Dallas" (Williams, Jr.) (2:45)
"Two Old Cats Like Us" (Troy Seals) (2:36) - featuring Ray Charles
"Country State of Mind" (Roger Alan Wade, Williams, Jr.) (4:01)
"Mind Your Own Business" (Williams) (2:29) - featuring Reba McEntire, Tom Petty, Willie Nelson and Reverend Ike
"Secret Agent Man" (Steve Barri, P.F. Sloan) (2:47)
"Wild Dogs" (Jonnie Barnett, Mike Lawler) (4:07)
"My Name Is Bocephus" (Williams, Jr.) (3:52)
"Workin' for MCA" (Ed King, Ronnie Van Zant) (1:43)
"I Really Like Girls"/"Rock and Roll Music" (George Thorogood, Chuck Berry) (4:05)
"The House of the Rising Sun" (Traditional) (3:21)
"The Blues Man" (Williams, Jr.) (4:18)

Disc Three
"Keep Your Hands to Yourself" (Dan Baird) (2:36)
"Walk This Way" (Steven Tyler, Joe Perry) (3:48)
"Heaven Can't Be Found" (Williams, Jr.) (3:13)
"Thanks a Lot" (Eddie Miller, Don Sessions) (2:54)
"All My Rowdy Friends (Have Settled Down) [Live Version]" (2:32)
"A Country Boy Can Survive [Live Version]" (7:18)
"You're Gonna Be a Sorry Man" (Al Anderson) (3:53)
"Tuesday's Gone (Allen Collins, Gary Rossington, Van Zant) (5:46)
"Mannish Boy (Bo Diddley, Muddy Waters, Mel London) (5:57)
"Finders Are Keepers" (Williams, Jr.) (3:01)
"There's a Tear in My Beer" (Williams) (2:52) - duet with Hank Williams
"Big Mamou" (Link Davis) (4:50)
"Man to Man" (Tommy Barnes, Williams, Jr.) (2:56)
"Stoned at the Jukebox" (Williams, Jr.) (2:59)
"'Tain't Nobody's Bizness If I Do" (Porter Grainger, Everett Robbins) (2:42)
"Lone Wolf" (Williams, Jr.) (3:52)
"If It Will It Will" (Williams, Jr.) (3:21)
"Hotel Whiskey" (Williams, Jr.) (3:48) - duet with Clint Black
"Low Down Blues" (Williams) (2:35)
"Naked Women and Beer" (Williams, Jr.) (3:29)

1992 compilation albums
Hank Williams Jr. compilation albums
Curb Records compilation albums